Olle Råde (born 11 December 1978) is a professional Magic: The Gathering player from Sweden. He was inducted to the Magic: The Gathering Pro Tour Hall of Fame as part of the inaugural class in 2005. Olle was also the first player awarded with the coveted Player of the Year award and was the first non-American player to win a pro tour event. He was also the youngest pro tour event winner at the time (at only 17 years old at the time of his win.) In April 2015 a poll was conducted by www.svenskamagic.com, the official Magic the Gathering-page of Sweden. There Olle was voted best Swedish magic player of all time, with 37.3% of the votes. In May 2016 Olle won the Swedish Open Championship of Magic the Gathering, playing his trademark deck white weenie with a red splash.

Accomplishments 
Olle Råde, at age 17, was the earnings leader in 1996, making $38,350.

References 

Living people
Swedish Magic: The Gathering players
1978 births
People from Gothenburg